Elwin Ira Rollins (October 9, 1926 – July 27, 1996) was a professional Canadian ice hockey goaltender who played for the Chicago Black Hawks, New York Rangers and the Toronto Maple Leafs.

Playing career
Before joining the NHL, Rollins played with the Vancouver Canucks in the PCHL. Next year, Rollins at age 21, moved to Edmonton to play for the Edmonton Flyers. Rollins believed the Flyers were a team capable of capturing the Allan Cup and he also believed if he played well enough he might get signed into the NHL. Rollins' gamble paid off and the Edmonton Flyers won the Allan Cup in 1947–48. He played 24 games that season, winning 20 and posting a 1.93 GAA.

Rollins played in the minor leagues for a couple of years before he was signed by the Toronto Maple Leafs in 1950–51. Rumors had it that he was there to simply put pressure on Turk Broda to lose weight. This was not exactly true as the Leafs also needed to shore up their rapidly thinning goaltender depth chart. That season the Maple Leafs won the Stanley Cup.

Rollins could not convince the Leafs management that he could be their full-time goaltender. In 1951–52, he was traded to the Chicago Black Hawks for veteran Harry Lumley. For five years he played for the Black Hawks, a team that usually finished last in the NHL which majorly contributed to his 141-205-83 record. But despite that, hockey pundits saw Rollins as one of the league's best goaltenders and in 1953–54 he played in the NHL All-Star Game and was awarded the Hart Trophy, even though he only won 12 games and lost 47 that season.

Rollins is, as of 2020, one of three eligible players, along with Tommy Anderson and Jose Theodore, to win the Hart Memorial Trophy and not be elected to the Hockey Hall of Fame.

In 1957–58, the Chicago Black Hawks acquired Glenn Hall from the Detroit Red Wings. Rollins was sent to the minor leagues as the Black Hawks preferred Hall. He would stay in the minor leagues until 1959–60, when he was signed on by the New York Rangers. He played 10 games with the club before he was sent back to the minor leagues again. This would mark the end of his NHL career. In 1966, although he was 37 years old, Rollins helped the Drumheller Miners to an Allan Cup victory in 1965–66.

Coaching career
After retiring, Rollins became a coach. He coached the University of Calgary hockey team as well as clubs in Spokane, Salt Lake City, Houston, Tulsa and Phoenix. As a coach, he achieved a good measure of success, including an Allan Cup victory with the Spokane Jets in 1970.  Rollins was named coach of the World Hockey Association's (WHA) Phoenix Roadrunners in 1976, replacing local favourite Sandy Hucul. Rollins was generally hated in Phoenix after his years as coach of the WHL rival Salt Lake Golden Eagles, and his tenure in Phoenix resulted in the demise of the Roadrunner franchise after only one season at the helm.

Rollins' son Jerry played in the now-defunct WHA.

Awards and achievements
Vezina Trophy Winner (1951)
Stanley Cup Championship (1951)
Hart Memorial Trophy Winner (1954)
Played in NHL All-Star Game (1954)
Allan Cup Championships as a player (1948, 1966)
Allan Cup Championship as a coach (1970)

Career statistics

Regular season and playoffs

Coaching record

References

External links
 

1926 births
1996 deaths
Buffalo Bisons (AHL) players
Calgary Stampeders (WHL) players
Canadian ice hockey goaltenders
Chicago Blackhawks players
Cleveland Barons (1937–1973) players
Hart Memorial Trophy winners
Ice hockey people from Saskatchewan
New York Rangers players
New York Rovers players
Phoenix Roadrunners (WHA)
Pittsburgh Hornets players
Portland Buckaroos players
Seattle Ironmen players
Stanley Cup champions
Toronto Maple Leafs players
Vezina Trophy winners
Winnipeg Warriors (minor pro) players
Canadian expatriate ice hockey players in the United States